Acronis Files Connect (formerly ExtremeZ-IP), initially developed by GroupLogic, is an Apple Filing Protocol server running on Windows operating systems, which enables Mac clients to access files via the Apple Filing Protocol.

On September 13, 2012, GroupLogic was acquired by Acronis. In 2015, ExtremeZ-IP was renamed to Access Connect and then re-branded as Acronis Files Connect in 2017.

Starting with version 8.0, the Network Reshare capability allows an Acronis Files Connect server to proxy access file shares on a secondary file server or NAS device, such as NetApp or Isilon.

Acronis Files Connect also provides access to other Windows services such as printing, searching, file system archiving, distributed file system, and volume shadow service.

Acronis Files Connect supports Macintosh clients running Mac OS X 10.7 or later, including macOS 10.15 Catalina.

Acronis Files Connect requires Windows and supports Windows Server 2019, 2016, 2012 R2, 2008 (R2, 32-bit & 64-bit), Windows Storage Server, Windows Home Server, Windows 2003 Server, Windows XP, Windows XP Embedded, and Windows Powered NAS.

Prior to 2015, the product was the first third-party file server to support Apple's Time Machine and to support searching of indexed content via Apple's Network Spotlight. This search is accomplished by translating and sending the query to Microsoft's Windows Search service before passing the results back to the Mac user via a reverse process. Acronis Files Connect links Macs to Microsoft's Distributed File System (DFS) and, with the optional ShadowConnect, to Microsoft's Volume Shadow Copy Service (VSS) snapshots.

Acronis Files Connect version 9.0 added the option to index remote volumes, which allows Mac users to Spotlight search remote volumes that don't have a local index search capabilities – including network attached storage (NAS) from EMC, NetApp, and Isilon, as well as StorNext SAN volumes.

Resources 
Technical Documentation

External links 
Acronis Website
GroupLogic Website
AFP548.com Apple Networking Community
Krypted.com Apple Networking Tutorials
MacWindows.com solution directory
Microsoft Pinpoint solutions directory

References 

Mac Observer Interviews Group Logic CEO
BusinessWeek Private Company Information: Group Logic, Inc.

Network file systems
Utilities for Windows
Utilities for macOS